Middle Eastern Americans are Americans of Middle Eastern background. According to the United States Census Bureau, the term "Middle Eastern American" applies to anyone of West Asian or North African origin. This includes people whose background is from the various Middle Eastern and West Asian ethnic groups, such as the Kurds and Assyrians, as well as immigrants from modern-day countries of the Arab world, Iran, Israel, Turkey, and sometimes Armenia.

Although once considered Asian Americans, the modern definition of "Asian American" now excludes people with West Asian backgrounds.

History

One of the first large groups of immigration from the Middle East to the United States came by boat from the Ottoman Empire in the late 1800s. Although U.S. officials referred to them as Turkish, most referred to themselves as Syrian, and it is estimated that 85 percent of these Ottoman immigrants came from modern Lebanon. Later, new categories were created for Syrians and Lebanese.

The number of Armenians who migrated to the U.S. from 1820 to 1898 is estimated to be around 4,000 and according to the Bureau of Immigration, 54,057 Armenians entered the U.S. between 1899 and 1917, with the vast majority coming from the Ottoman Empire. The largest Armenian American communities at that time were located in New York City; Fresno; Worcester, Massachusetts; Boston; Philadelphia; Chicago; Jersey City; Detroit; Los Angeles; Troy, New York; and Cleveland.

Another wave of immigration from the Middle East began in 1946, peaking after the 1960s. Since 1968, these immigrants have arrived from such countries as Iran, Iraq, Israel, Palestine, Syria, Egypt, and Lebanon.

Population

The population of Middle Eastern Americans totals at least 10 million. In 2012, Pew Research estimated the population of Arab Americans to be 3.7 million people.  In 2014, the U.S. Secretary of Commerce stated that there were over 1 million Turkish Americans in the U.S.

The population of Middle Eastern Americans includes both Arabs and non-Arabs. In their definitions of Middle Eastern Americans, United States Census Bureau and the National Health Interview Survey include peoples (diasporic or otherwise) from present-day Iran, Israel, Turkey, and Armenia.

As of 2013, an estimated 1.02 million immigrants from the Middle East and North Africa (MENA) lived in the United States, making up 2.5 percent of the country's 41.3 million immigrants. Middle Eastern and North African immigrants have primarily settled in California (20%), Michigan (11%), and New York (10%). Data from the United States Census Bureau shows that from 2009 to 2013, the four counties with the most MENA immigrants were Los Angeles County, California; Wayne County, Michigan (Detroit), Cook County, Illinois (Chicago), and Kings County, New York (Brooklyn); these four counties collectively "accounted for about 19 percent of the total MENA immigrant population in the United States."

By ethnicity 
Although the United States census has recorded race and ethnicity since the first census in 1790, this information has been voluntary since the end of the Civil War (non-whites were counted differently from 1787 to 1868 for the purpose of determining congressional representation). As such, these statistics do not include those who did not volunteer this optional information, and so the census underestimates the total populations of each ethnicity actually present.

Although tabulated, "religious responses" were reported as a single total and not differentiated, despite totaling 1,089,597 in 2000.

Independent organizations provide improved estimates of the total populations of races and ethnicities in the US using the raw data from the US census and other surveys.

According to a 2002 Zogby International survey, the majority of Arab Americans are Christian; the survey showed that 24% of Arab Americans were Muslim, 63% were Christian and 13% belonged to another religion or no religion. Christian Arab Americans include Maronites, Melkites, Chaldeans, Orthodox Christians, and Copts; Muslim Arab Americans primarily adhere to one of the two main Islamic denominations, Sunni and Shia.

Notable people

Academia

 Daron Acemoglu, economist, of Armenian descent
 Huda Akil, Syrian American neuroscientist and medical researcher
 Adah al-Mutairi (Saudi Arabian), inventor and scholar in nanotechnology and nanomedicine
 M. Amin Arnaout, Lebanese American nephrologist and biologist
 Naseer Aruri, chancellor professor of political science at University of Massachusetts, Dartmouth (Palestinian)
 Anthony Atala, director of the Wake Forest Institute for Regenerative Medicine (Lebanese)
 İlhan Aksay, professor, Princeton University
 Elias J. Corey, organic chemistry professor at Harvard University, winner of the 1990 Nobel Prize in Chemistry (Lebanese parents)
 Michael E. DeBakey, Lebanese American cardiovascular surgeon and researcher, 1963 Lasker Award laureate
 Mostafa El-Sayed, Egyptian American US National Medal of Science laureate; leading nanoscience researcher; known for the spectroscopy rule named after him, the El-Sayed rule
 Farouk El-Baz Egyptian American space scientist who worked with NASA to assist in the planning of scientific exploration of the moon
 Yasmine Belkaid, Algerian American immunologist, professor and a senior investigator at the National Institute of Allergy and Infectious Diseases
 Hunein Maassab, Syrian American professor of epidemiology and the inventor of the live attenuated influenza vaccine
 Joanne Chory, plant biologist and geneticist (Lebanese)
 Noureddine Melikechi, Algerian American Atomic, Molecular, and Optical Physicist, member of the Mars Science Laboratory
 Michel T. Halbouty, Lebanese American geologist and geophysicist; pioneer in oil field research
 Essam Heggy, Egyptian American Planetary scientist
 Shadia Habbal, Syrian American astronomer and physicist specialized in Space physics
 Mohamed Atalla, engineer, inventor of MOSFET (metal–oxide–semiconductor field-effect transistor), pioneer in silicon semiconductors and security systems, founder of Atalla Corporation
 Charles Elachi, Lebanese American professor of electrical engineering and planetary science at Caltech and the former director of the Jet Propulsion Laboratory
 Fawwaz T. Ulaby Syrian American professor of electrical engineering and computer science, former vice president of research for the University of Michigan; first Arab American winner of the IEEE Edison Medal
 Taher ElGamal, Egyptian American cryptographer, inventor of the ElGamal discrete log cryptosystem and the ElGamal signature scheme
 Ali H. Nayfeh, Palestinian American mechanical engineer, the 2014 recipient of Benjamin Franklin Medal in mechanical engineering
 Dina Katabi, Syrian American professor of electrical engineering and computer science at MIT and the director of the MIT Wireless Center.
 Abbas El Gamal, Egyptian American electrical engineer, educator and entrepreneur, the recipient of the 2012 Claude E. Shannon Award
 Oussama Khatib, roboticist and professor of computer science 
 Elias Zerhouni, former director of the National Institutes of Health (Algerian)
 Hassan Kamel Al-Sabbah, Lebanese American technology innovator. He received 43 patents covering his work. Among the patents were reported innovations in television transmission.
 Mohammad S. Obaidat (Jordanian), computer science/engineering academic and scholar
 Charbel Farhat, Vivian Church Hoff Professor of Aircraft Structures; Director of the Army High Performance Computing Research Center; Chair of the Department of Aeronautics and Astronautics, Stanford University (Lebanese)
 Hany Farid, professor of computer science at Dartmouth College, pioneer in Digital forensics (Egyptian)
 Munther A. Dahleh, professor and director at Massachusetts Institute of Technology (Palestinian)
 Ismail al-Faruqi, philosopher, professor (Palestinian)
 Fouad Ajami, professor of international relations (Lebanese)
 Saddeka Arebi, professor of anthropology at UC Berkeley (Libyan)
 Mohammed Adam El-Sheikh, executive director of the Fiqh Council of North America (Sudanese)
 Samih Farsoun, sociology professor at the American University (Palestinian)
 Philip Khuri Hitti, historian of Arab culture and history (Lebanese)
 Philip S. Khoury, Ford International professor of history and associate provost at the Massachusetts Institute of Technology (Lebanese)
 Laura Nader, cultural anthropologist (Lebanese)
 Ahmed Ismail Samatar, writer, professor and former dean of the Institute for Global Citizenship at Macalester College; Somali ancestry
 Nada Shabout, art historian and professor of art history at University of North Texas (Palestinian-Iraqi)
 Nadia Abu El Haj, author and professor of anthropology at Barnard College and subject of a major tenure controversy case at Columbia University (Palestinian)
 Ibrahim Abu-Lughod, former director of Graduate Studies at Northwestern University, father of Lila Abu-Lughod (Palestinian)
 Lila Abu-Lughod, professor of anthropology and women's and gender studies at Columbia University (Palestinian)
 Leila Farsakh, professor of political science at the University of Massachusetts, Boston (Palestinian)
 Samih Farsoun, professor of sociology at American University and editor of Arab Studies Quarterly (Palestinian)
 Nadia Hijab, Journalist with Middle East Magazine and Senior Fellow at the Institute for Palestine Studies (Palestinian)
 Rashid Khalidi, Edward Said Professor of Modern Arab Studies at Columbia University (Palestinian-Lebanese)
 Farid Khavari, economist, specialist in economics, environment, oil, healthcare, & the Middle East.
 Joseph Massad, professor at Columbia University known for his work on nationalism and sexuality in the Arab world (Palestinian)
 Afshin Molavi, author and expert on global geo-political risk and geo-economics, particularly the Middle East and Asia.
 Hisham Sharabi  professor emeritus of history and Umar al-Mukhtar Chair of Arab Culture at Georgetown University (Palestinian)
 Rosemarie Said Zahlan, historian, journalist, and author, sister of Edward Said (Palestinian-Lebanese)
 Steven Salaita, former professor of English at Virginia Tech, winner of Myers Outstanding Book Award for the Study of Human Rights 2007 (Palestinian)
 Majid Khadduri, academic and founder of the Paul H. Nitze School of Advanced International Studies Middle East Studies program (Iraqi)
 Thomas L. Saaty, Assyrian-Iraqi University Professor at the University of Pittsburgh
 Ella Shohat, professor, author and activist (Iraqi-Jewish)
 Saadi Simawe, translator, novelist and teacher (Iraqi)
 Aziz Sancar, biochemist and molecular biologist specializing in DNA repair, cell cycle checkpoints, and circadian clock. Nobel Prize in Chemistry, 2015 (Turkish)
 Donny George Youkhanna, Iraqi archaeologist, anthropologist, author, curator, and scholar, and visiting professor at Stony Brook University in New York, internationally known as "the man who saved the Iraqi National Museum."
 Imad-ad-Dean Ahmad, teaches religion, science, and freedom at the University of Maryland, College Park; directs the Minaret of Freedom Institute (Palestinian)
 Muhsin Mahdi, Iraqi American Islamologist and Arabist.
 Talal Asad, anthropologist at the CUNY Graduate Center. (Saudi Arabian)
 Mitch Daniels, president of Purdue University (Syrian)
 Donna Shalala, president of the University of Miami (Lebanese)
 Joseph E. Aoun, president of Northeastern University (Lebanese)
 Robert Khayat, chancellor of the University of Mississippi (Lebanese)
 Behnaam Aazhang, J. S. Abercrombie Professor in Electrical and Computer Engineering at Rice University (Iranian)
 Kamyar Abdi, archaeologist, former assistant professor in the Department of Anthropology, Dartmouth College (Iranian)
 Alexander Abian, mathematician, Iowa State University (Iranian-Armenian)
 Mohammad Javad Abdolmohammadi,  John E. Rhodes Professor of Accounting at Bentley University since 1988. (Iranian)
 Ervand Abrahamian, historian of Middle Eastern (particularly Iranian) history at City University of New York (Iranian)
 Janet Afary, author, feminist activist, and professor of Religious Studies at the University of California, Santa Barbara. (Iranian)
 Gholam Reza Afkhami, senior scholar and director of Social Science Research and International Studies at the Foundation for Iranian Studies
 Shahriar Afshar, physicist and inventor who is the namesake of the Afshar experiment
 Newsha Ajami, hydrologist specializing in urban water policy and sustainable water management; professor and director of Urban Water Policy program at Stanford University
 Abass Alavi, professor of radiology, Nuclear Medicine and Neurology at the University of Pennsylvania
 Leonardo Alishan,  professor of Persian and Comparative Literature at the University of Utah (1978–1997)
 Abbas Alizadeh, archeologist of ancient Iran; former senior research associate and director of the Iranian Prehistoric Project at the University of Chicago
 Abbas Amanat, professor of history and international studies at Yale University
 Hooshang Amirahmadi, academic and political analyst. Professor of the Edward J. Bloustein School of Planning and Public Policy at Rutgers University
 Nahid Angha, Sufi scholar,. Co-director and co-founder of the International Association of Sufism (IAS), founder of the International Sufi Women Organization, and executive editor of the journal Sufism: An Inquiry
 Anousheh Ansari, first Iranian in space and the first female space tourist;
 Nima Arkani-Hamed, theoretical physicist and professor at the Institute for Advanced Study in Princeton, New Jersey
 Abbas Ardehali, surgical director of UCLA's Heart and Lung Transplant program
 Saïd Amir Arjomand, professor of sociology at Stony Brook University, and director of the Stony Brook Institute of Global Studies. Founding editor of the Journal of Persianate Studies
 Yahya Armajani, professor of history and soccer coach at Macalester College
 Reza Aslan, scholar of religious studies, television host, and author of No God but God: The Origins, Evolution, and Future of Islam and Zealot: The Life and Times of Jesus of Nazareth. Currently a professor of creative writing at University of California, Riverside. Board member of the National Iranian American Council (NAIC)
 Abolhassan Astaneh-Asl, structural engineer and professor at University of California, Berkeley; investigated the collapse of the World Trade Center towers due to the September 11 attacks
 Fakhreddin Azimi, professor of history at the University of Connecticut
 Babak Azizzadeh, facial plastic and reconstructive surgeon, Keck School of Medicine of USC
 Sussan Babaie, art historian and curator, specialist in Persian art and Islamic art of the early modern period.especially the Safavid dynasty
 Shaul Bakhash, historian, expert in Iranian studies, George Mason University, Clarence J. Robinson Professor of History
 Laleh Bakhtiar, author and translator of 25 books about Islam, many of which deal with Sufism. She is best known for her 2007 translation of the Qur'an, known as The Sublime Quran,
 Mehrsa Baradaran, law professor specializing in banking law at University of Georgia
 Iraj Bashiri, professor of history at the University of Minnesota specialist in the fields of Central Asian studies and Iranian studies
 Asef Bayat, professor of sociology and Middle Eastern studies at the University of Illinois at Urbana–Champaign
 Manuel Berberian, earth scientist, specializing in earthquake seismology, geophysics, archaeoseismology, and environmental geoscience
 Mina Bissell, scientist and biologist known for research on breast cancer; former head of life science at the Lawrence Berkeley National Laboratory
 George Bournoutian, historian, professor of history at Iona College, and author of over 30 books on the history of Armenia, Iran, and the Caucasus
 Jennifer Tour Chayes, mathematical physicist and theoretical computer scientist, and world renowned leading expert on the modeling & analysis of dynamically growing graphs. Founder, Technical Fellow, & Managing Director of Microsoft Research New England & Microsoft Research New York
 Houchang Chehabi, historian, expert in Iranian studies at the Frederick S. Pardee School of Global Studies, Boston University, where he is professor of international relations and History
 Aaron Cohen-Gadol, internationally renowned neurosurgeon specializing in surgical treatment of brain tumors and aneurysms
 Hamid Dabashi, professor of Iranian studies and comparative literature at Columbia University in New York City
 Jaleh Daie, scientist, former professor of biology and department chairs at the University of Wisconsin-Madison and Rutgers University
 Richard Danielpour, professor of composition, Manhattan School of Music
 Touraj Daryaee, Iranologist and historian at the University of California, Irvine
 Armen Der Kiureghian, professor of civil engineering at University of California, Berkeley, member of U.S. National Academy of Engineering,  current president of the American University of Armenia
 Sibel Edmonds, former translator who worked as a contractor for the Federal Bureau of Investigation (FBI); founder of the National Security Whistleblowers Coalition (NSWBC)
 Azita Emami, Andrew and Peggy Cherng professor of electrical engineering and medical engineering at Caltech; Executive Officer of the Department of Electrical Engineering at Caltech
 Nader Engheta, H. Nedwill Ramsey professor of electrical and systems engineering at the University of Pennsylvania. He has made pioneering contributions to the fields of metamaterials, transformation and plasmonic optics, nano- and graphene photonics, nano- and miniature antennas, and bio-inspired optical imaging, among many others
 Dara Entekhabi, Bacardi and Stockholm Water Foundations Professor in the Department of Civil & Environmental Engineering and the Department of Earth, Atmospheric & Planetary Sciences at MIT. His main expertise is in the field of hydrology.
 Haleh Esfandiari, Middle East scholar and former director of the Middle East Program at the Woodrow Wilson International Center for Scholars. She is an expert on contemporary Iranian intellectual currents and politics, as well as women's issues and democratic developments in the Middle East. She was one of the four Iranian Americans falsely convicted and detained by the Iranian government in May 2007.
 Kamran Eshraghian, electrical engineer, notable for his work on VLSI and CMOS VLSI design
 Fariba Fahroo, mathematician, program manager at the Air Force Office of Scientific Research. Along with I. M. Ross, she has published papers in pseudospectral optimal control theory. The Ross–Fahroo lemma and the Ross–Fahroo pseudospectral method are named after her
 Fereydoon Family, leading physicist in the field of nanotechnology and solid-state physics. He is the Samuel Candler Dobbs Professor of Physics at Emory University
 Allah Verdi Mirza Farman Farmaian, professor and head of Biology department at Rutgers University
 Sattareh Farmanfarmaian, founder and director of the Tehran School of Social Work. Co-founder of the Family Planning Association of Iran, and former vice-president of the International Planned Parenthood Federation
 Alimorad Farshchian, medical doctor, medical author, and founder and director of The Center of Regenerative Medicine in Miami, Florida
 Nariman Farvardin, president of Stevens Institute of Technology, and former provost of University of Maryland
 Bobak Ferdowsi, systems engineer at NASA's Jet Propulsion Laboratory; served on the Cassini–Huygens and Mars Science Laboratory Curiosity mission.
Alexander L. George (born Alexander L. Givargis), behavioral scientist specialist in the psychological effects of nuclear crisis management, Graham H. Stuart professor emeritus of political science at Stanford University
 Mohammadreza Ghadiri, chemist and professor of chemistry at The Scripps Research Institute.  Awarded the Feynman Prize in Nanotechnology in 1998
 Roozbeh Ghaffari, inventor, bioelectronics entrepreneur, biomedical engineering research faculty at Northwestern University
 Zoubin Ghahramani, professor of information engineering at the University of Cambridge
 Kambiz GhaneaBassiri, professor of religion at Reed College, and author of A History of Islam in America and Competing Visions of Islam in the United States.
 M.R. Ghanoonparvar, professor emeritus of Persian and comparative literature at the faculty of Middle Eastern studies at the University of Texas, Austin
 Morteza Gharib, Hans W. Liepmann Professor of Aeronautics and Bio-Inspired Engineering at Caltech.
 Jamshid Gharajedaghi, organizational theorist, management consultant, & adjunct professor of Systems thinking at Villanova University. B
 John Ghazvinian, author, historian and former journalist. Associate Director of the Middle East Center at the University of Pennsylvania.
 Doreen Granpeesheh, clinical psychologist,  and producer of the documentary Recovered: Journeys Through the Autism Spectrum and Back.
 Vartan Gregorian, president of The Carnegie Corporation of New York and former president of Brown University
 Mohammad Hajiaghayi, computer scientist known for his work in algorithms, game theory, network design, and big data.  Jack and Rita G. Minker professor at the University of Maryland Dept. of Computer Science.
 Ali Hajimiri, inventor, technologist, and Thomas G. Myers Professor of Electrical Engineering at Caltech. Fellow of the National Academy of Inventors (NAI)
 Babak Hassibi, electrical engineer, the inaugural Mose and Lillian S. Bohn Professor of Electrical Engineering. Specialist in communications, signal processing and control.
Payam Heydari, professor of electrical engineering and computer science, University of California, Irvine
 Shireen Hunter, research professor at the Center for Muslim-Christian Understanding at Georgetown University.
 Ahmad Iravani, philosopher, scholar, and clergyman. Professor of theology at the University of California, Davis. Founder, president, and executive director of "Center for the Study of Islam and the Middle East"
 Ali Jadbabaie, systems theorist, network scientist, and the JR East Professor of Engineering at Massachusetts Institute of Technology
 Ali Jafari, professor of computer and information technology at Purdue University, director of the CyberLab at Indiana University-Purdue University Indianapolis (IUPUI)
 Hamid Jafarkhani, leading communication theorist and chancellor's professor of electrical engineering and computer science at the University of California, Irvine
 Ramin Jahanbegloo, philosopher at University of Toronto
 Farnam Jahanian, computer scientist and the 10th president of Carnegie Mellon University
 Ali Javan, physicist, inventor of gas laser; Professor Emeritus of Physics at MIT
 Hassan Jawahery, physicist, former spokesman of the BaBar Collaboration, and professor of physics at the University of Maryland
 Majd Kamalmaz, psychotherapist who has been illegally detained in Syria since 2017
 Sepandar Kamvar, computer scientist, Stanford University
 Mehran Kardar, physicist and professor of physics at MIT, and co-faculty at the New England Complex Systems Institute
 Morvarid Karimi, neurologist and medical researcher, specialist in neuroimaging of the pathophysiology of movement disorders. She was an assistant professor of Neurology in the Movement Disorders Section at Washington University School of Medicine in St. Louis, Missouri
 Ahmad Karimi-Hakkak, Iranist, scholar of modern Persian literature, and professor and founding director of the Roshan Center for Persian Studies at the University of Maryland
 Elham Kazemi, mathematics educator and educational psychologist; Geda and Phil Condit Professor in Math and Science Education in the College of Education of the University of Washington
 Firuz Kazemzadeh, historian of Russian and Iranian history, and professor emeritus of history at Yale University.
 Homayoon Kazerooni, roboticist and professor of mechanical engineering at the University of California, Berkeley; director of the Berkeley Robotics and Human Engineering Laboratory
 Fatemeh Keshavarz, scholar of Rumi and Farsi language & poetry, and poet in Persian and English;  Director & Chair of Roshan Institute for Persian Studies at the University of Maryland. Previously, was a professor of Persian Language and Comparative Literature at Washington University in St. Louis
 Ali Khademhosseini, Levi Knight Endowed Professor at the University of California-Los Angeles. Holds a professorship in bioengineering, radiology, chemical, and biomolecular engineering.
 Laleh Khalili, professor of Middle Eastern Politics at the School of Oriental and African Studies at the University of London. She also writes regularly for Iranian.com
 Samira Kiani, health systems engineer at Arizona State University. Her work combines CRISPR technology with synthetic biology. She is a 2019 AAAS Leshner Fellow.
 Farinaz Koushanfar, professor and Henry Booker Faculty Scholar of Electrical and Computer Engineering at the University of California, San Diego
 Habib Levy, historian, specialist in the history of Jews in Iran; author of Comprehensive History of the Jews of Iran: The Outset of the Diaspora.
 Mohammad Jafar Mahjoub, Iranian scholar of Persian literature, essayist, translator, and professor. Moved to the U.S. in 1991 and taught at the University of California, Berkeley
 Hoooman Majd, journalist, author, and commentator
 G. A. Mansoori, professor of chemical engineering at University of Illinois at Chicago
 Alireza Mashaghi, biophysicist and medical scientist at Leiden University and Harvard University
 Bahram Mashhoon, general relativity physicist and professor of physics at the University of Missouri. Through his research works, he has given important contributions to general relativity, particularly to the gravitomagnetic clock effect. He is also active in the field of non-local gravity
 Viken Babikian, professor at Boston University School of Medicine
 Peter Balakian, professor of humanities at Colgate University
 Paul Boghossian, professor of philosophy at New York University
 Peter Boghossian, professor of philosophy at Portland State University
 Aram Chobanian, dean of Boston University School of Medicine
 Harry Daghlian, academic scientist
 Richard Dekmejian, professor at University of Southern California
 James Der Derian, Watson Institute professor of International Studies and Political Science at Brown University
 Edward Goljan, professor of pathology at Oklahoma State University Center for Health Sciences
 Hrach Gregorian, writer and teacher on international conflict management and post-conflict peace building
 Vartan Gregorian, former president of Brown University and current president of the Carnegie Corporation
 Marjorie Housepian Dobkin (1922–2013), professor emerita of English at Barnard College.
 Richard G. Hovannisian, professor of Armenian History at UCLA
 Raffi Indjejikian, professor of accounting at University of Michigan
 Joseph Albert Kechichian, author
 Mark Krikorian, executive director of Center for Immigration Studies
 Robert Mehrabian, president of Carnegie Mellon
 Gevork Minaskanian, professor of organic chemistry at Virginia Commonwealth University
 Josh Pahigian, professor of global humanities at the University of New England
 George Piranian, professor of mathematics at the University of Michigan
 Barbara Sahakian, professor of Clinical Neuropsychology at University of Cambridge
 Mark Saroyan, professor of Soviet studies at Harvard and UC Berkeley
 Rashid Massumi, cardiologist and clinical professor, best known for his pioneering research in the field of electrophysiology. He was also known for bringing modern cardiology to Iran, and for being the cardiologist to the last Shah of Iran and, until 1980, Ayatollah Khomeini
 Noah McKay (born Nasser Talebzadeh Ordoubadi), physician and author of Wellness at Warp Speed
 Robert Mehrabian, material scientist, former president of Carnegie Mellon University, and chair, president, and CEO of Teledyne Technologies
 Houra Merrikh, microbiologist and a full professor at Vanderbilt University
 Abbas Milani, director of Iranian studies program at Stanford University; research fellow & co-director of the "Iran Democracy Project" at Stanford's Hoover Institution
 Farzaneh Milani, professor of Persian Literature & Women's Studies at the University of Virginia, and the chair of the Department of Middle Eastern and South Asian Languages & Cultures.
 Mohsen Milani, foreign policy analyst, and professor of politics at the University of South Florida
 Maryam Mirzakhani, Stanford University professor; first female winner of the Fields Medal
 Jasmin Moghbeli, NASA astronaut candidate of the class of 2017
 Mehryar Mohri, professor of computer science at the Courant Institute of Mathematical Sciences at New York University. Specialist in machine learning, automata theory and algorithms, speech recognition and natural language processing
 Parviz Moin, fluid dynamicist, professor of mechanical engineering at Stanford University. 2011 inductee to the United States National Academy of Sciences
 Mohsen Mostafavi, architect and educator, dean and Alexander and Victoria Wiley Professor at the Harvard Graduate School of Design
 Farzad Mostashari, internal medicine physician, former national coordinator for health information technology at U.S. Department of Health and Human Services
 Hossein Khan Motamed, surgeon, founder of the Motamed Hospital in Tehran, Iran, and personal physician of Mohammad Reza Shah.
 Negar Mottahedeh, cultural critic and film theorist
 Roy Mottahedeh, Gurney Professor of History, Emeritus at Harvard University, specialist in pre-modern social and intellectual history of the Islamic Middle East. Former director of Harvard's Center for Middle Eastern Studies (1987–1990), and inaugural director of Harvard's Prince Alwaleed Bin Talal Islamic Studies Program (2005–2011)
 Hamid Mowlana, professor emeritus of international relations and founding director of the Division of International Communication at the School of International Service at American University. In 2003, he was honored as a "Chehrehaye Mandegar" (Eternal One) by Iranian universities and academies.
 Eden Naby, Iranian-Assyrian cultural historian of Central Asia and the Middle East, who is notable for her publications, research, and preservation work on Assyrian culture and history
 Firouz Naderi, former NASA director of Mars project. Has also served in other various technical and executive positions at NASA's Jet Propulsion Laboratory.
 Hamid Naficy, scholar of cultural studies of diaspora, exile, & postcolonial cinemas and media, and of Iranian & Middle Eastern cinemas.  Hamad Bin Khalifa Al-Thani Professor in Communication at Northwestern University .
 Paul M. Naghdi, professor of mechanical engineering at the University of California, Berkeley. Specialist in continuum mechanics
 Majid M. Naini (مجید ناینی), Rumi scholar, computer scientist, former professor at University of Pennsylvania,  writer on poetry, science, technology, and mysticism
 Kayvan Najarian, associate professor of computer science, Virginia Commonwealth University
 Seyyed Hossein Nasr, professor of Islamic studies at George Washington University; prominent Islamic philosopher
 Vali Nasr, author and scholar on the Middle East and Islamic world; Served as Dean of the Johns Hopkins School of Advanced International Studies (SAIS) in Washington D.C.
 Angella Nazarian (née Angella Maddahi), former professor of psychology at Mount St. Mary's University, California State University, Long Beach & the Los Angeles Valley College.  Co-founder of Looking Beyond
 Camran Nezhat, laparoscopic surgeon and director of Stanford Endoscopy Center for Training & Technology, Stanford University
 Kathy Niakan, human developmental and stem cell biologist. In 2016, she became the first scientist in the world to gain regulatory approval to edit the genomes of human embryos for research.
 Reza Olfati-Saber, roboticist and assistant professor of engineering at Dartmouth College
 Kaveh Pahlavan, professor of computer and electrical engineering, professor of computer science, and director of the Center for Wireless Information Network Studies (CWINS) at the Worcester Polytechnic Institute
 Firouz Partovi, physicist; founder and former chairman of the Faculty of Physics at the Sharif University of Technology. He has also taught at MIT and Harvard University.
 Massoud Pedram, computer engineer known for his research in green computing, power optimization (EDA), low power electronics and design, and electronic design automation.
 Gholam A. Peyman, ophthalmologist, retina surgeon, and inventor of LASIK eye surgery
 Nader Pourmand, professor of biomolecular engineering at the Baskin School of Engineering
 Ali R. Rabi, scholar at the Center for International Development and Conflict Management at University of Maryland, College Park;  founding chair of the Middle Eastern Citizens Assembly; Initiated the International University of Iran in 2001.
 Samuel Rahbar, biomedical scientist, discovered the linkage between HbA1C and diabetes
 Hazhir Rahmandad, engineer and expert in dynamic modeling and system dynamics. Associate Professor in the System Dynamics group at the MIT Sloan School of Management.
 Yahya Rahmat-Samii, professor and the Northrop Grumman Chair in Electromagnetics at Electrical Engineering Department at UCLA
 Behzad Razavi, professor of electrical engineering and director of the Communications Circuit Laboratory at the University of California, Los Angeles. y
 Manijeh Razeghi, Walter P. Murphy professor and director of the Center for Quantum Devices at Northwestern University, pioneer in semiconductors and optoelectronic devices.
 Zabihollah Rezaee, accountant, Thompson-Hill Chair of Excellence and professor of accounting at the University of Memphis
 Sakineh (Simin) M. Redjali, psychologist and author. She was the first female professor at the National University of Iran
 Darius Rejali, professor of political science at Reed College and scholar specialized in the study of torture. He has served on the board of the Human Rights Review since 2000.
 Daron Acemoglu, economist at Massachusetts Institute of Technology
 Faruk Gül, professor of economics, Princeton University
 Reza Hamzaee, economist and BOG-Distinguished Professor of Economics at Missouri Western State University. Specialist in banking and managerial economics
 Esfandiar Maasoumi, econometrician and economist. He is a distinguished professor at Emory University and a fellow of the Royal Statistical Society
 Abbas Mirakhor, economist; former executive director and dean of board of the International Monetary Fund (IMF);  Distinguished Scholar and chair in Islamic Finance at Malaysia's INCEIF (International Centre for Education in Islamic Finance)
 Nouriel Roubini, economist; professor of economics at the Stern School of Business, New York University
 Djavad Salehi-Isfahani, professor of economics at Virginia Tech, and visiting fellow at the Middle East Youth Initiative at the Wolfensohn Center for Development at the Brookings Institution. His expertise is on demographic & energy economics and the economics of Iran & the larger Middle East
 Pardis Sabeti, computational geneticist, assistant professor, Center for Systems Biology and Department of Organismic and Evolutionary Biology, Harvard University
 Ahmad Sadri, sociologist and professor of sociology and anthropology at Lake Forest College, and the James P. Gorter Professor of Islamic World Studies since 2007. Active in the reform movement in Iran.
 Mahmoud Sadri, professor of sociology at the Federation of North Texas Area Universities. His major interests are in religious, cultural & theoretical sociology, reform Islam and interfaith dialogue.
 Omid Safi, professor of Asian and Middle Eastern studies at Duke University, director of the Duke Islamic Studies Center, and columnist for On Being. Scholar of Islamic mysticism (Sufism)
 Mehran Sahami, professor and the associate chair for education in the Computer Science department at Stanford University.  Robert and Ruth Halperin University Fellow in Undergraduate Education at Stanford.
 Muhammad Sahimi, professor of chemical engineering and materials science and current NIOC chair in petroleum engineering at USC
 David B. Samadi, vice chairman of the Department of Urology and Chief of Robotics and Minimally Invasive Surgery at the Icahn School of Medicine at Mount Sinai
 Eliz Sanasarian, professor of political science at the University of Southern California. Specialist ethnic politics and feminism, particularly regarding the Middle East and Iran
 Kamal Sarabandi, professor of engineering at the University of Michigan
 Homayoun Seraji, senior research scientist at NASA's Jet Propulsion Laboratory and Caltech, former professor at Sharif University of Technology. Works in the field of robotics and space exploration.
 Cyrus Shahabi, chair of the Computer Science Department, University of Southern California
 Mohammad Shahidehpour, Carl Bodine Distinguished Professor and chairman in the Electrical and Computer Engineering Department at Illinois Institute of Technology
 Ghavam Shahidi, electrical engineer and IBM Fellow, Director of Silicon Technology at IBM's Watson's Laboratory
 Alireza Shapour Shahbazi, lecturer in Achaemenid archeology and Iranology at Harvard University, full professor of history in Eastern Oregon University
 Manuchehr Shahrokhi, professor of Global Business-Finance at California State University; Founding Editor of Global Finance Journal; executive director of Global Finance Association
 Fatemeh Shams, contemporary Persian poet, and assistant professor of Persian literature at the University of Pennsylvania
 Shahrokh Shariat, urologist; professor & chairman of the Department of Urology of the Medical University of Vienna, Vienna, Austria; adjunct professor of urology and medical oncology at Weill Cornell Medical Center & at the University of Texas Southwestern Medical Center.
 Nasser Sharify, distinguished professor and dean emeritus of the School of Information and Library Science at Pratt Institute
 Siamack A. Shirazi, scientist, professor and graduate coordinator of the Mechanical Engineering department at the University of Tulsa.
 Hamid Shirvani, architecture scholar, former president of Briar Cliff University, former chancellor of North Dakota University System.
 Rahmat Shoureshi, former president of Portland State University; former president, provost and professor at New York Institute of Technology
 Sam Sofer, scientist who specializes in biological processes and bioreactor design.
 Saba Soomekh, professor of religious studies, women's studies, and Middle Eastern history at UCLA and Loyola Marymount University. Author of books and articles on contemporary and historical Persian Jewish culture
 Shahrbanou Tadjbakhsh, university lecturer at Sciences Po, researcher, and United Nations consultant in peacekeeping, conflict resolution, counter-terrorism and radicalization. Best known for her work in "Human Security"
 Kian Tajbakhsh, social scientist, urban planner, and professor of urban planning at Columbia University. One of the four Iranian-Americans falsely convicted and detained by the Iranian government in May 2007
 Ray Takeyh, Middle East scholar and senior fellow at the Council on Foreign Relations
 Kamran Talattof, Persian literature and Iranian culture; director of Persian Program University of Arizona
 Vahid Tarokh, professor of electrical and computer engineering, Bass Connections Professor, a professor of mathematics (secondary), and computer science (secondary) at Duke University
 Nader Tehrani, designer, Dean of the Irwin S. Chanin School of Architecture at Cooper Union, and former professor of architecture and department chair at the MIT School of Architecture and Planning.
 Ehsan Yarshater, founder and editor in chief of Encyclopaedia Iranica, first full-time professor at a U.S. university since World War II; Hagop Kevorkian Professor Emeritus of Iranian Studies; director of the Center for Iranian Studies, Columbia University;
 Seema Yasmin, director of the Stanford Health Communication Initiative at Stanford University
 Mohammad Yeganeh, economist, former governor of the Central Bank of Iran (1973–1975), professor of economics at Columbia University (1980–1985)
 Houman Younessi, researcher and educator in informatics, computer science, and molecular biology. Former research professor at the University of Connecticut;
 Mark Zandi, chief economist of Moody's Analytics
 John Shahidi, software developer and manager, brother of Sam
 Sam Shahidi, software developer and manager, brother of John
 Arif Dirlik
 Taner Akçam, University of Minnesota professor, historian specializing in the Armenian genocide
 Ciğdem Balım
 Asım Orhan Barut, University of Colorado-Boulder physicist
 Mine Çetinkaya-Rundel, associate professor of the practice in statistics at Duke University
 Feza Gürsey, mathematician and physicist
 M. Şükrü Hanioğlu, professor of Near Eastern studies, Princeton University
 Alp Ikizler, nephrologist, holder of the Catherine McLaughlin Hakim Chair in Medicine at Vanderbilt University School of Medicine
 Merve Kavakçı, George Washington University professor and former Fazilet Party Parliamentarian exiled from Turkey for violating the Public Head Scarf Ban
 Hasan Özbekhan
 Edward Said, Palestinian-Lebanese American literary theorist and former professor at Columbia University
 Ahmed Tewfik, Egyptian American electrical engineer, Professor and college administrator
 Mehmet Toner, cryobiologist, professor of surgery at the Harvard Medical School, and professor of biomedical engineering at the Harvard-MIT Division of Health Sciences and Technology
 Turgay Uzer, Georgia Institute of Technology physicist
 Cumrun Vafa, string theorist and Donner Professor of Science at Harvard University. Recipient of the 2008 Dirac Medal and the 2016 Breakthrough Prize in Fundamental Physics.
 Saba Valadkhan, biomedical scientist, assistant professor and RNA researcher at Case Western Reserve University, recipient of Young Scientist Award in 2005 for the mechanism of spliceosomes
 Roxanne Varzi, associate professor of anthropology and film and media studies at the University of California, Irvine, documentary filmmaker, and writer
 Vamık Volkan, Princeton University professor emeritus of psychiatry
 Omar M. Yaghi, Jordanian American reticular chemistry pioneer; winner of the 2018 Wolf Prize in Chemistry
 Nur Yalman, octolingual Harvard University professor of social anthropology and Middle Eastern studies
 Osman Yaşar, professor and chair of the computational science department at State University of New York College at Brockport
 K. Aslihan Yener, University of Chicago archaeologist who uncovered a new source of Bronze Age Anatolian tin mines
 Edip Yüksel, Islamic philosopher and intellectual, cfigures in the modern Islamic reform and Quranism movements
 Lotfi A. Zadeh, mathematician, computer scientist, and professor emeritus of computer science at the University of California, Berkeley; father of fuzzy logic and fuzzy sets
 Norm Zada, former adjunct mathematics professor,  and founder of Perfect 10; son of Lotfi A. Zadeh
 Reza Zadeh, computer scientist at Stanford University
 Iraj Zandi, emeritus professor of systems, University of Pennsylvania
 Ahmed Zewail, Egyptian American scientist, known as the "father of femtochemistry", winner of the 1999 Nobel Prize in Chemistry
 Huda Zoghbi, Lebanese American physician and medical researcher who discovered the genetic cause of the Rett syndrome

Business
The most famous ones include

 Melih Abdulhayoğlu, founder, CEO, and president of Comodo Group
Mohamed Atalla, engineer, inventor of MOSFET (metal–oxide–semiconductor field-effect transistor), most frequently manufactured device in history. Pioneer in silicon semiconductors and security systems, founder of Atalla Corporation
Sam Gores, founder of talent agency Paradigm Agency; on the Forbes list of billionaires (LebanesePalestinian)
Najeeb Halaby, former head of Federal Aviation Administration and CEO of Pan-American Airlines, and father of Queen Noor of Jordan (Lebanese-Syrian father)
Mario Kassar, formerly headed Carolco Pictures (Lebanese)
John J. Mack, CEO of investment bank Morgan Stanley (Lebanese parents)
 Joseph Lubin (entrepreneur), Canadian-American founder of blockchain software technology company ConsenSys, co-founder of Ethereum
 Bob Miner, co-founder of Oracle Corporation and the producer of its relational database management system
 Sina Tamaddon, senior vice president of applications for Apple Computer

Literature
Khalil Gibran, writer, poet, and member of the New York Pen League; the third-best-selling poet of all time (Lebanese)
William Peter Blatty, American writer best known for his 1971 horror novel The Exorcist (Lebanese)
Laila Lalami, Pulitzer Prize-nominated novelist, journalist, essayist, and professor (Moroccan) 
Mikhail Naimy, Nobel Prize-nominated author; member of the New York Pen League; well-known works include The Book of Mirdad (Lebanese)
Edward Said, literary theorist, thinker, and the founder of the academic field of postcolonial studies (Palestinian)
Ameen Rihani, "father of Arab American literature," member of the New York Pen League and author of The Book of Khalid, the first Arab American novel in English; also an ambassador
Mona Simpson, author of Anywhere but Here (Syrian father)
Stephen Adly Guirgis, Pulitzer Prize-winning playwright (Egyptian father)
Elmaz Abinader, poet, playwright, memoirist, writer (Lebanese)
Diana Abu-Jaber, novelist and professor, author of Arabian Jazz and Crescent (Jordanian)
Elia Abu Madi, poet, publisher and member of the New York Pen League (Lebanese)
Etel Adnan, poet, essayist, and visual artist (Syrian father)
Catherine Filloux, French-Algerian-American playwright
Suheir Hammad, poet, playwright, artist, Tony Award winner, 2003 (Russel Simmons Presents Def Poetry Jam on Broadway)
Samuel John Hazo, State Poet of Pennsylvania
Lawrence Joseph, poet
Lisa Suhair Majaj, poet and literary scholar
Jack Marshall, poet and author (Iraqi father/Syrian mother)
Khaled Mattawa, poet, recipient of an Academy of American Poets award
Claire Messud, author, Algerian
Naomi Shihab Nye, poet
Abraham Rihbany, writer on politics and religion
 Steven Salaita, expert on comparative literature and post-colonialism, writer, activist (Palestinian/Jordanian)
 Colet Abedi, young adult novelist and television producer
 Salar Abdoh, novelist and essayist. Current director of the graduate program in creative writing at the City College of New York.
 Kaveh Akbar, poet and scholar
 Laleh Bakhtiar, writer and scholar
 Fereydoon Batmanghelidj, writer of books on health and wellness. 
 Najmieh Batmanglij, acclaimed chef and cookbook author
 William D. S. Daniel, Iranian-Assyrian author, poet, and musician
 Parvin Darabi, writer and women's rights activist. Best known for book Rage Against the Veil
 Jasmin Darznik, author of The Good Daughter: A Memoir of My Mother's Hidden Life and Song of a Captive Bird
 Firoozeh Dumas, author of Funny in Farsi: A Memoir of Growing Up Iranian in America
 FM-2030, author, teacher, transhumanist philosopher, futurist; author of Are You a Transhuman?: Monitoring and Stimulating Your Personal Rate of Growth in a Rapidly Changing World (1989)
 Sara Farizan, writer of young adult literature. Best known for novel, If You Could Be Mine (2013)
 Ezzat Goushegir, fiction writer & playwright
 Roya Hakakian, writer, poet, and journalist
 Hakob Karapents, novelist and short story writer whose works were written in both Armenian and English. Settled in the U.S. in 1947.
 Laleh Khadivi, novelist and documentary filmmaker
 Porochista Khakpour, novelist, essayist, and writer
 Tahereh Mafi, novelist of young adult fiction
 Mahtob Mahmoody, author of autobiographical memoir My Name is Mahtob and daughter of Betty Mahmoody, the author of Not Without My Daughter
 Faranak Margolese, writer, best known as author of Off the Derech
 Marsha Mehran, novelist, author of international bestsellers Pomegranate Soup (2005) and Rosewater and Soda Bread (2008)
 Shokooh Mirzadegi, novelist and poet, who worked for Ferdowsi magazine and Kayhān daily in the late 1960s in Iran. 
 Azadeh Moaveni, author of Lipstick Jihad and co-author of Iran Awakening with Shirin Ebadi, and reporter for Time magazine on Iran and the Middle East
 Melody Moezzi, writer, attorney, and author of Haldol and Hyacinths: A Bipolar Life and War on Error: Real Stories of American Muslims.
 Ottessa Moshfegh, writer, author of Eileen
 Farnoosh Moshiri, novelist, playwright, and librettist. Professor of creative writing and literature at the University of Houston-Downtown
 Dora Levy Mossanen, author of historical fiction
 Azar Nafisi, writer, best known for Reading Lolita in Tehran: A Memoir in Books
 Gina Nahai, author of Cry of the Peacock, Moonlight on the Avenue of Faith, and Caspian Rain
 Steven Naifeh, Pulitzer Prize-winning biographer of Jackson Pollock and Vincent van Gogh, co-author of 18 other books with Gregory White Smith, businessman, and artist
 Dina Nayeri, novelist, essayist, and short story writer. Author of A Teaspoon of Earth and Sea and Refuge
 Abdi Nazemian, author and screenwriter. Best known for The Walk-In Closet
 Ghazal Omid, nonfiction political writer, nonfiction children's book writer, speaker, NGO executive
 Shahrnoosh Parsipour, writer
 Susan Atefat Peckham, poet
 Saïd Sayrafiezadeh, memoirist, playwright, and fiction writer
 Dalia Sofer, writer, best known for The Septembers of Shiraz
 Neda Soltani, writer of My Stolen Face and political exile
 Mahbod Seraji, writer, best known for Rooftops of Tehran
 Mahmoud Seraji, a.k.a. "M.S. Shahed," poet best known for his trilogy Mazamir Eshgh (مزامیر عشق). Father of Mahbod Seraji
 Solmaz Sharif, poet, known for her debut poetry collection, Look. Currently a Jones Lecturer at Stanford University
 Andrew David Urshan, evangelist and author. Known as the "Persian Evangelist", ks
 Sholeh Wolpe, poet, editor and literary translator
 Walter Abish, novelist, poet, and short story writer
 Herman Wouk, novelist and non-fiction writer
 Anzia Yezierska, novelist
 Ed Lacy (Ed Lacy), novelist

Politics
 Mark Esper, 27th Secretary of Defense (2019–2020) (Lebanese)
 Alex Azar, Secretary of Human Health and Service (2018–2021) (Lebanese)
 William Barr, Attorney General (2019–2021)
 Steven Mnuchin, 77th secretary of Treasury (2017–2021)
 James Abdnor, U.S. Senator (R-South Dakota) (1981–1987)
 John Abizaid, retired general (Lebanese) 
 James Abourezk, U.S. Senator (D-South Dakota) (1973–1979) (Lebanese ancestry)
 Spencer Abraham, U.S. Secretary of Energy (2001–2005) and U.S. Senator (R-Mich.) Secretary of Energy under Bush (1995–2001) (Lebanese ancestry)
 Justin Amash, U.S. Representative (R-Michigan) (2011–2021), Palestinian and Syrian descent
 Victor G. Atiyeh, Governor of Oregon (R) (1979–1987) (Syrian)
 John Baldacci, Governor of Maine (D) (2003–2011) (Lebanese mother)
 Rosemary Barkett, U.S. federal judge and the first woman Supreme Court Justice and Chief Justice for the state of Florida (Syrian)
 Charles Boustany, U.S. Representative from Louisiana; cousin of Victoria Reggie Kennedy (Lebanese)
 Pat Danner, U.S. Congresswoman (D-Mo.) (1993–2001)
 Brigitte Gabriel, pro-Israel activist and founder of the American Congress For Truth (Lebanese)
 Philip Charles Habib, Under Secretary of State for Political Affairs and Special Envoy to Ronald Reagan (Lebanese)
 Lisa Halaby (a.k.a. Queen Noor), Queen-consort of Jordan and wife of King Hussein of Jordan (father is of Syrian descent)
 Darrell Issa, U.S. Congressman (R-California) (2001–) (Lebanese father)
 Joe Jamail, Renown American trial lawyer and billionaire, also known as the "King of Torts"  (Lebanese)
 James Jabara, colonel and Korean War flying ace (Lebanese)
 Chris John, U.S. Congressman (D-Louisiana) (1997–2005) (Lebanese ancestry)
 George Joulwan, retired general, former NATO commander-in-chief (Lebanese)
 George Kasem, U.S. Congressman (D-California) (1959–1961)
 Abraham Kazen, U.S. Congressman (D-Texas) (1967–1985) (Lebanese ancestry)
 Jill Kelley, global advocate and American socialite (Lebanese)
 Victoria Reggie Kennedy, attorney and widow of late Senator Ted Kennedy (Lebanese)
 Muna Khalif, fashion designer and MP in the Federal Parliament of Somalia (Somali)
 Johnny Khamis, Councilmember from San Jose (Lebanese)
 Ray LaHood, U.S. Congressman (R-Illinois) (1995–2009), U.S. Secretary of Transportation (2009–2013) (Lebanese and Jordanian ancestry)
 Darin LaHood, U.S. Congressman (R-Illinois) (born 2015), son of Ray Lahood
 George J. Mitchell, U.S. Senator (D-Maine) (1980–1995) United States of America special envoy to the Middle East under the Obama administration, U.S. senator from Maine, Senate Majority Leader (Lebanese mother)
 Mohamed Abdullahi Mohamed, President of Somaila (2017-) former prime minister of Somalia (Somali descent)
 Ollie Mohamed, President pro tempore of the Mississippi State Senate (1992) (Lebanese ancestry)
 Ralph Nader, politician and consumer advocate, author, lecturer, and attorney, candidate for US Presidency 
 Jimmy Naifeh, Speaker of the Tennessee House of Representatives (D) (Lebanese ancestry)
 Mary Rose Oakar, U.S. Congresswoman (D-Ohio) (1977–1993)
 Abdisalam Omer, Foreign Minister of Somalia (Somali descent)
 Ilhan Omar,  U.S. Congresswoman (D-Minnesota) (born 2019), DFL Party member of the Minnesota House of Representatives (Somali/Yemeni) 
 Jeanine Pirro, former Westchester County District Attorney and New York Republican attorney general candidate (Lebanese parents)
 Dina Powell, U.S. Deputy National Security Advisor for Strategy (2017–2018) (Egyptian)
 Nick Rahall, U.S. Congressman (D-West Virginia) (1977–2015) (Lebanese ancestry)
 Selwa Roosevelt (Lebanese), former Chief of Protocol of the United States and wife of the late Archibald Bulloch Roosevelt, Jr., grandson of President Theodore Roosevelt
 Zainab Salbi, co-founder and president of Women for Women International (Iraqi)
 Donna Shalala, U.S. Secretary of Health and Human Services (1993–2001) (Lebanese parents)
 Chris Sununu, Governor of New Hampshire (R) (2017–), son of Governor John H. Sununu
 John E. Sununu, U.S. Senator (R-New Hampshire) (2003–2009) (father is of Lebanese and Palestinian ancestry)
 John H. Sununu, Governor of New Hampshire (R) (1983–1989) and chief of staff to George H. W. Bush (Lebanese and Palestinian ancestry)
 James Zogby (Lebanese), founder and president of the Arab American Institute
 Hady Amr, Deputy Assistant Secretary for Israeli-Palestinian Affairs and Press and Public Diplomacy (2021-), founding director of Brookings Doha Center (Lebanese father)
 Parry Aftab, Internet privacy and security lawyer, considered one of the founders of cyberlaw. Founder of the cybersafety organizations WiredSafety, StopCyberbullying and the consulting firm, WiredTrust
 Roozbeh Aliabadi, advisor and commentator on geopolitical risk and geoeconomics. Current partner at global affair practice at GGA in New York City, former Senior Advisor to the Department of Strategic Initiatives, Ministry of Foreign Affairs in Iran
 Mahnaz Afkhami, women's rights activist who served in the Cabinet of Iran from 1976 to 1978; executive director of the Washington-based Foundation for Iranian Studies, and the founder and president of the Women's Learning Partnership (WLP)
 Goli Ameri, former Under Secretary General for Humanitarian Values and Diplomacy for the International Federation of Red Cross and Red Crescent Societies, former U.S. Assistant Secretary of State for Educational and Cultural Affairs, former U.S. public delegate to the United Nations General Assembly, and former Republican candidate for the United States House of Representatives from the 1st district of Oregon.
 Cyrus Amir-Mokri, former Assistant Secretary of the Treasury for Financial Institutions at the U.S. Treasury Department
 Jamshid Amouzegar, economist and politician who served as Prime Minister of Iran (1977–1978). Immigrated to U.S. in 1978
 Hushang Ansary, former Iranian Minister of Economic Affairs and Finance, former Ambassador of Iran to the United States (1967–1969) and chairman of National Finance Committee of Bush-Cheney 2004 campaign.
 Gholam Reza Azhari, military leader and Prime Minister of Iran (1978–1979). Immigrated to the U.S. in 1979
 Pantea Beigi, human rights advocate, known for her media appearances commenting on the human rights conditions in Iran in the wake of the 2009 Iranian presidential election protests. She has served as an AmeriCorps member for the PeaceJam foundation, notably working with Dr. Shirin Ebadi in her efforts to address social and economic injustices of the youth in Iran
 Michael Benjamin, 1996 Republican candidate for the U.S. House from the 8th district of New York, and 2004 United States Senate Republican Primary candidate from New York
 Makan Delrahim, United States Assistant Attorney General for the United States Department of Justice Antitrust Division under the Trump Administration
 Jimmy Delshad, former mayor of Beverly Hills, California (2007–2008, 2010–2011),  first Iranian-born mayor of an American city
 Eugene Dooman, counselor at the United States Embassy in Tokyo during the period of critical negotiations between the U.S. and Japan before World War II
 Abdullah Entezam, Iranian diplomat, Iranian ambassador to France (1927) and to West Germany, secretary of the Iranian embassy in the United States. Father of Hume Horan
 Anna Eshoo, U.S. Representative of California's 18th congressional district
 Anna Eskamani, member of the Florida House of Representatives.
 Abbas Farzanegan, former governor of the state of Esfahan, communications minister and diplomat during Mohammad Reza Pahlavi's reign. Key figure in facilitation of the 1953 Iranian coup d'état. Immigrated to the U.S. in 1975
 Shireen Ghorbani, at-large member of the Salt Lake County Council, representing 1.1 million residents
 Rostam Giv, 3rd representative of Iranian Zoroastrians in Iranian parliament, senator of the Iranian Senate, and philanthropist to the Zoroastrian community in Iran, then United States, and the world. Immigrated to the U.S. in 1978.
 Ferial Govashiri, served as the personal secretary to U.S. President Barack Obama at the White House (2014–2017). Currently is the chief of staff to the chief content officer of Netflix
 Hrach Gregorian, political consultant, educator, and writer. His work has taken him internationally as a consultant on international conflict management, and post-conflict peacebuilding
 Cyrus Habib, 16th Lieutenant Governor of Washington, and president of the Washington State Senate. First and so far only Iranian-American elected to state office
 Kamal Habibollahi, last commander of the Imperian Iranian Navy until the Iranian Revolution and the last CNO commander of the Pahlavi dynasty. Also held several minister positions under the military government of Gholam Reza Azhari in 1978. Immigrated to the U.S. after the Iranian Revolution
 Shamsi Hekmat, women's rights activist who pioneered reforms in women's status in Iran. Founded the first Iranian Jewish women's organization (Sazman Banovan Yahud i Iran) in 1947. After her migration to the U.S., she established the Iranian Jewish Women's Organization of Southern California s.
 Shahram Homayoun, political dissident of the government of the Islamic Republic of Iran, and owner of "Channel One," a Persian satellite TV station based in Los Angeles that broadcasts into Iran daily
 Hume Horan, diplomat and former U.S. ambassador to Cameroon, Equatorial Guinea, Sudan, Saudi Arabia, and the Ivory Coast. Son of Abdullah Entezam
 Fereydoon Hoveyda, former Iranian ambassador to the United Nations (1971–1979). Since his exile to the U.S., senior fellow and member of the executive committee of the National Committee on American Foreign Policy (NCAFP)
 Shaban Jafari, Iranian political figure, practitioner of Pahlevani and zoorkhaneh rituals. Key figure in the facilitation of the 1953 Iranian coup d'état. Exiled to the United States soon after the 1979 revolution
 Anna Kaplan (née Anna Monahemi), first Iranian-American elected to New York State Senate
 Zahra Karinshak, attorney and politician.
 Mehdi Khalaji, political analyst, writer, and scholar of Shia Islamic studies. Senior research fellow at the Washington Institute for Near East Policy, a D.C.-based foreign policy think tank. He has frequently contributed to journalistic outlets such as BBC, The Guardian, The Washington Post, and The New York Times
 Alan Khazei, social entrepreneur; founder and CEO of "Be The Change, Inc",  dedicated to building coalitions among non-profit organizations and citizen . Co-founder and former CEO of City Year, an AmeriCorps national service program
 Bijan Kian, businessman, member of the board of directors of the Export–Import Bank of the United States, partner of Michael Flynn in the Flynn Intel Group, and worked with the Trump administration transition team in regards to the Office of the Director of National Intelligence
 Paul Larudee, political activist and a major figure in the pro-Palestinian movement. He is involved in the International Solidarity Movement and the founder of the Free Gaza Movement and the Free Palestine Movement
 Ahmad Madani, former commander of the Imperial Iranian Navy (1979), governor of the Khuzestan province, and candidate of the first Iranian presidential election. After his exile to the United States in 1980, he was the chairman of the National Front outside of Iran.
 Cyrus Mehri, attorney and partner at Mehri & Skalet. Best known for helping establish the National Football League's (NFL) Rooney Rule
 Mariam Memarsadeghi, democracy and human rights advocate
 Ross Mirkarimi, former member of San Francisco City Council and former San Francisco Sheriff. Co-founder of the Green Party of California
 Mohammad Hassan Mirza II, last Crown Prince of Iran from the rule of the Qajar dynasty & heir apparent to the Qajar Sun Throne. Currently lives in Dallas, Texas.
 Shayan Modarres, civil right activist known for his representation of the family of Trayvon Martin, and a 2014 Democratic primary candidate for the U.S. House from the 10th district of Florida
 Esha Momeni, women's rights activist and a member of the One Million Signatures campaign
 David Nahai, environmental attorney, political activist, former head of the Los Angeles Department of Water and Power
 Adrin Nazarian, Member of the California State Assembly from the 46th district. First Iranian-American elected to the California State Legislature
 John J. Nimrod, minority rights activist and Illinois state senator of District 4 (1973–1983) of Iranian-Assyrian descent; notable for his promotion of Assyrian causes and for the rights of other under-represented minority groups throughout the world, such as Uyghurs and Tibetans
 Alex Nowrasteh, immigration policy analyst currently at the Center for Global Liberty and Prosperity at the Cato Institute, and previously at the Competitive Enterprise Institute. He is a national expert on immigration policy
 Vali Nasr, Shia scholar and poetical scientist. Senior Fellow in foreign policy at the Brookings Institution
 Prince Abdul Reza Pahlavi, son of Reza Shah and half-brother of Mohammad Reza Pahlavi. Immigrated to the U.S. with other relatives immediately prior to the Islamic revolution of 1979
 Prince Ali-Reza Pahlavi, younger son of Mohammad Reza Pahlavi and Farah Pahlavi. He was second in the order of succession to the Iranian throne prior to the Iranian revolution. 
 Princess Ashraf Pahlavi, twin sister of Mohammad Reza Pahlavi. Considered to be the "power behind her brother" and instrumental in the 1953 coup d'état which led him taking the throne. Served her brother as a Palace advisor and a strong advocate for women's rights.
 Farah Pahlavi, widow of Mohammad Reza Shah and former shahbanu (empress) of Iran
 Princess Farahnaz Pahlavi, eldest daughter of Mohammad Reza Pahlavi and Farah Pahlavi. Currently resides in New York City
 Reza Pahlavi, Crown Prince of Iran, last heir apparent of the Imperial State of Iran and current head of the exiled House of Pahlavi. Oldest son of Mohammad Reza Pahlavi and Farah Pahlavi. Founder and former leader of the National Council of Iran. Currently resides in Bethesda, Maryland. 
 Shams Pahlavi, elder sister of Mohammad Reza Pahlavi. Former president of the Red Lion and Sun Society. Exiled to the United States after the 1979 revolution
 Yasmine Pahlavi, lawyer and wife of Reza Pahlavi, Crown Prince of Iran. Co-founder and former director of the Foundation for the Children of Iran. Currently resides in Bethesda, Maryland
 Mehrdad Pahlbod, Iranian royal and first culture minister of Iran (1964–1968). He was the second husband of Princess Shams Pahlavi. Immigrated to the U.S. and resided in Los Angeles after the 1979 revolution
 Trita Parsi, founder and current president of the National Iranian American Council. He regularly writes articles and appears on TV to comment on foreign policy
 Noraladin Pirmoazzen, Iranian politician who served as a member of the 6th and 7th Islamic Consultative Assembly from the electorate of Ardabil, Nir, Namin and Sareyn.  Immigrated to the U.S. in 2008.
 Azita Raji, former United States Ambassador to Sweden appointed by Barack Obama
 Farajollah Rasaei, Commander of the Imperial Iranian Navy (1961–1972), the most Senior Naval Commander of the Iranian Navy. Exiled to the U.S. after the 1979 revolution
 Parviz Sabeti, former SAVAK deputy under the regime of Mohammad Reza Shah. One of the most powerful men in the last two decades of the Pahlavi regime. Exiled to the U.S. in 1979.
 Ahsha Safaí, elected member of the San Francisco Board of Supervisors representing Supervisorial District 11
 David Safavian, disgraced former chief of staff of the United States General Services Administration
 Karim Sanjabi, Iranian politician of the National Front of Iran. Settled in the U.S. after the 1979 revolution
 Hajj Sayyah, first Iranian to obtain an American citizenship, world traveler, and political activist. Played a major role in the Persian Constitutional Revolution of 1906.
 Mohsen Sazegara, pro-democracy political activist and journalist. He held several offices in the government of Mir-Hossein Mousavi. His reformist policies clashed with the Supreme Leader Ali Khamenei, eventually resulting in his arrest and later exile. He currently resides in the U.S.
 Farhad Sepahbody, former ambassador of Iran to Morocco (1976–1979). Exiled to the U.S. after the Iranian Revolution
 Soraya Serajeddini, Iranian-Kurdish human rights activist. Former executive vice president of the Kurdish National Congress of North America. 
 Mehdi Shahbazi, political activist and businessman. He was known for protest against major oil companies at the grounds of his Shell Oil gas station franchises
 Azadeh N. Shahshahani, human rights attorney
 Ali Shakeri, activist and businessman. Serves on the Community Advisory Board of the Center for Citizen Peacebuilding at the University of California, Irvine, and is the founder and active member of Ettehade Jomhourikhahan-e Iran (EJI), which advocates for a democratic and secular republic in Iran. He was one of the four Iranian-Americans detained by the Iranian government in May 2007.
 Jafar Sharif-Emami, former prime minister of Iran (1960–1961, 1978–1979), former president of the Iranian Senate (1964–1978), and former Minister of Foreign Affairs of Iran (1960). Exiled to the U.S. in the wake of the Iranian Revolution
 Faryar Shirzad, former Deputy National Security Advisor and White House Deputy Assistant for International Economic Affairs to President George W. Bush
 Yasmine Taeb, human rights attorney and Democratic National Committee official. She is a senior policy counsel at the Center for Victims of Torture
 Ramin Toloui, Assistant Secretary for International Finance, United States Department of the Treasury
 Bob Yousefian, former mayor of Glendale, California
 Steven Derounian, Republican, New York (1953–1965)
 Adam Benjamin, Jr., Democrat, Indiana (1977–1982)
 Chip Pashayan, Republican, California (1979–1991)
 Anna Eshoo, Democrat, California (1993–2013)
 John E. Sweeney, Republican, New York (1999–2007)
 Jackie Speier, Democrat, California (2008–)
 Anthony Brindisi, Democrat, New York (2019–2021)
Robert Mardian, United States Assistant Attorney General (1970–1972)
George Deukmejian, Republican, California (1983–1991)
George Deukmejian, California Attorney General (1979–1983)
Julia Tashjian, Secretary of the State of Connecticut (1983–1991)
Dickran Tevrizian, United States District Court for the Central District of California (1985–2005)
 Marvin R. Baxter, associate justice of the Supreme Court of California (1991–2015)
 Brad Avakian, commissioner of the Oregon Bureau of Labor and Industries (2008–2019)
Rachel Kaprielian, Massachusetts Registrar of Motor Vehicles (2008–2014); Massachusetts Secretary of Labor and Worforce Development
 George Deukmejian, 35th governor of California, 27th attorney general of California, member of the California State Senate (1967–1979) and State Assembly (1963–1967)
 Joe Simitian, member of the Santa Clara County Board of Supervisors (2013-)

See also

 Middle East
 Greater Middle East
 Anti-Middle Eastern sentiment

References

Further reading
Maghbouleh, Neda (2017). The Limits of Whiteness: Iranian Americans and the Everyday Politics of Race. Stanford, CA: Stanford University Press.

American people of Middle Eastern descent
Middle Eastern American
Middle Eastern people
Middle Eastern diaspora
Ethnic groups in the United States